Switched On (also known as Switched On Stereolab or Switched On Volume 1) is a compilation of Stereolab's first three releases, and was originally released in 1992. The album's name is in tribute to Switched-On Bach and other similar titles from the late 1960s to 1970s that feature Moog synthesizers as the primary instrument.  Switched On was later licensed to Slumberland Records for a US release, and Rough Trade Germany, for that country, both in 1992.

Compiled of tracks from Super 45 and Super-Electric EPs plus the Stunning Debut Album 7" single, the album forms the first part of a pentalogy (as of 2022) of Stereolab rarities collections along with Refried Ectoplasm and Aluminum Tunes. A fourth compilation, Electrically Possessed, was released in 2021, collecting non-album material spanning from 1999 to 2008, and a fifth compilation, titled Pulse of the Early Brain, was released on September 02, 2022.

Track listing

 Tracks 1, 4, 6, and 8 taken from Super-Electric EP
 Tracks 3, 5, 7, and 9 taken from Super 45 EP
 Tracks 2 and 10 taken from Stunning Debut Album 7" single

Personnel
Laetitia Sadier - vocals
Gina Morris - vocals
Tim Gane - guitar, Moog synthesizer, Farfisa organ
Martin Kean - bass
Joe Dilworth - drums

References

1992 compilation albums
Switched On